The 2011 Hartlepool Borough Council election took place in May 2011 to fill a third of the Hartlepool Borough Council's seats, though there was no election that year in Elwick. No seats were earned unopposed. The Labour Party earned 46% of votes cast and won 69% of the available seats.

Election result

Ward results

References

2012 English local elections
2012
2010s in County Durham